Innlandet is an island in Kristiansund Municipality in Møre og Romsdal county, Norway. The island is the smallest of the four main islands of the town of Kristiansund (the others are Kirkelandet, Gomalandet, and Nordlandet). The island is connected to the island of Kirkelandet (to the north) by the Sørsund Bridge. The  island sits east of the Bremsnesfjorden and west of the island of Nordlandet.

The island was barely affected by the bombings during World War II, so the island is full of the characteristic old wooden buildings that were prevalent in the 1800s and early 1900s.

See also
List of islands of Norway

References

Islands of Møre og Romsdal
Kristiansund